Bill Ladbury (14 October 1891 – June 1917) was an English professional boxer who competed from 1908 to 1917. He held the IBU world flyweight title from 1913 to 1914, as well as the British and European flyweight titles in 1913.

Career
Born in New Cross, London, in 1891, Ladbury had his first professional fight in November 1908. In January 1910 he stopped Charles Ledoux in four rounds and in October 1911 he beat Albert Cocksedge to take the English 112lbs title. In November 1911 he fought Ledoux again, this time losing in four rounds, and was knocked out by Johnny Hughes only 8 days later. In 1912 he had three fights against Joe Fox, winning two and losing the third.

After a run of eight straight wins he faced Sid Smith in June 1913 for the British, European, and World (IBU) flyweight titles; He stopped Smith in the eleventh round to take the three titles. He lost all three titles in January 1914 when he was outpointed over 20 rounds by Percy Jones.

He drew with Joe Symonds in March 1914, and beat Tommy Harrison a month later, but in his third fight in eight weeks was stopped in the eighth round by Tancy Lee at the end of April.

With the outbreak of World War I, Ladbury joined the British Army, initially serving as a private in the Royal West Kent Regiment, rising to Lance-Corporal by late 1916.

He beat Hughes in December but lost all three of his fights in 1915 including another fight with Jones. His final fight was a win over Bert Clark in May 1917.

Bill Ladbury was killed in action in France in June 1917.

Professional boxing record

References

External links
Career record at boxrec.com
Career record at boxinghistory.org.uk

|-

1891 births
1917 deaths
English male boxers
Flyweight boxers
Boxers from Greater London
British military personnel killed in World War I
British Army personnel of World War I
Military personnel from London
Queen's Own Royal West Kent Regiment soldiers